The 1999–2000 season of the Jupiler League was held between August 6, 1999, and May 11, 2000.  Sporting Anderlecht became champions.

Promoted teams

These teams were promoted from the second division at the start of the season:
KV Mechelen (second division champions)
Verbroedering Geel (playoff winner)

Relegated teams
These teams were relegated to the second division at the end of the season:
Verbroedering Geel
Lommel

Anderlecht's title success
Anderlecht became champions on April 21, 2000, after the defeat of rival Club Brugge at Herman Vanderpoortenstadion to Lierse 1-0 as, prior to these results, they were 7 points ahead of Brugge with 3 matches to go.  The next day Anderlecht beat Racing Genk 4-1 and then Standard Liège 2-0.

Battle for Europe
Club Brugge and Gent qualified for the UEFA Cup.

The relegation dog fight
Charleroi avoided relegation with a controversial draw against Anderlecht on the last day of the season.  Anderlecht were already champions and played with Enzo Scifo who had previously signed a deal with Charleroi.  However, the result was irrelevant as Geel lost their last match to Club Brugge and were thus relegated with Lommel.

Final league table

Results

Top goal scorers

See also
1999–2000 in Belgian football

References
 Sport.be website - Archive

Belgian Pro League seasons
Belgian
1999–2000 in Belgian football